P series or P-series may refer to:

 the  p-series in mathematics, related to convergence of certain series
 P-series fuels, blends of fuels
 Huawei P series, mobile phone series by Huawei
 IBM pSeries, computer series by IBM
 Ruger P series – pistols
 ThinkPad P series, mobile workstation line by Lenovo
 Sony Cybershot P-series digital cameras, see Cyber-shot
 Sony Vaio P series – notebook computers
 Sony Ericsson P series, a series of cell phones
 Vespa P-series motor scooters

See also
 O series (disambiguation)
 Q series (disambiguation)
 T series (disambiguation)